Gurdas Singh Badal (6 August 1931 – 15 May 2020) was an Indian politician and parliamentarian. He was born in Abulkharana, Firozpur district. He was the brother of Parkash Singh Badal. He was elected to the seventh Lok Sabha from Fazilka constituency in 1967 as member of Shiromani Akali Dal. He died on 15 May 2020 at a private hospital in Mohali.

Family 
He was the son of late Raghu Raj Singh Dhillon, and the younger brother of former Chief Minister of Punjab, Parkash Singh Badal. His son Manpreet Singh Badal was the Finance Minister of Punjab. His wife Harmandar Kaur died in March 2020.

Political career 
He was member of the Punjab Legislative Assembly from March 1967 – April 1969. He was elected to the 5th Lok Sabha from 15 March 1971 – 18 January 1977 from Fazilka constituency representing the Akali Dal (now known as the Shiromani Akali Dal).

References 

1931 births
2020 deaths
People from Fazilka district
Shiromani Akali Dal politicians
Indian Sikhs
Lok Sabha members from Punjab, India
India MPs 1971–1977
India MPs 1977–1979
India MPs 1980–1984
People from Firozpur district